Where's Officer Tuba is an EP by the band Thinking Fellers Union Local 282, released in 1993.

Track listing
 "Wide Forehead" (4.04)
 "A Gentleman's Lament" (2.45)
 "Outhouse Of The Pryeeeee" (5.04)
 "I Am Beautiful, I Am Good" (1.46)
 "Hive" (4.37)
 "Heaven For Real Idiots" (1.20)
 "Strolling Big Butter" (1.50)
 "282 Years" (2.48)

1993 EPs
Thinking Fellers Union Local 282 albums